Miconia santaritensis is a species of plant in the family Melastomataceae. It is endemic to Panama.  It is threatened by habitat loss.

References

Endemic flora of Panama
santaritensis
Vulnerable plants
Taxonomy articles created by Polbot